Mawdesley Hall is a country manor in Hall Lane, Mawdesley, Chorley, Lancashire, England.  It consists of a central hall with two cross-wings.  The central hall was built in the 17th century, its lower storey being timber-framed and its upper floor plastered and painted to resemble timber-framing.  The cross-wings were added in the late 18th or early 19th century.  The west wing is in sandstone, and the east wing is in brick with stone dressings.  The hall is recorded in the National Heritage List for England as a designated Grade I listed building.

Associated with the hall are two Grade II listed buildings.  Leading up to the garden of the hall is a flight of stone steps that are dated 1653.  To the northwest of the hall is a timber-framed former cattle house that was built in the late 16th or early 17th century.

Location

History

The original part of the hall was built in the 17th century and was the home of the Mawdesley family.  Inside the hall the dates 1625 and 1655 are inscribed.  Towards the end of the 18th or the beginning of the 19th century wings were added to each end of the original hall.  Later a lean-to building was added to the rear of the hall.

Architecture

The building is in two storeys, and has an H-shaped plan, consisting of a two-bay central hall, with two two-bay cross-wings. The roof is covered in stone-coloured tiles, and is hipped over the fronts of the wings. Each part of the house is built in different materials. Its lower storey is timber-framed with plaster panels on a stone plinth. The upper floor is jettied and is plastered, and is painted to give the appearance of timber-framing. Towards the right end of the lower storey is a doorway and to the left of this is a long mullioned and transomed window. In the upper floor are three casement windows that were inserted later. The windows have architraves with keystones, and sills on corbels.

Appreciation

Mawdesley Hall was designated as a Grade I listed building on 22 October 1952.  Grade I is the highest of the three grades of listing, and is applied to buildings that are "of exceptional interest, sometimes considered to be internationally important".

Associated structures

Entrance steps
Leading up from the road to the garden of the hall is a flight of eight sandstone steps that are dated 1653.  They are protected on the outside by a sloping parapet with roll-moulded coping.  The steps incorporate an enclosed viewing platform on an open-topped turret with loopholes on its sides.  They were designed as a Grade II listed building on 22 October 1952.  Grade II is the lowest of the grades of listing, and is applied to buildings that are "nationally important and of special interest".

Former cattle house
To the northwest of the hall is a former cattle house, which was later used as a store.  It dates from the 16th or early 17th century, and is timber-framed on a high sandstone plinth, with a roof of stone-coloured tiles.  It has four bays, with an outshut at the rear of the third bay.  The panels are plastered and painted white.  On each side there are four doorways.  The cattle house wa also designated as a Grade II listed building on 22 October 1952.

See also

Grade I listed buildings in Lancashire
Listed buildings in Mawdesley

References

Further reading

Grade I listed buildings in Lancashire
Grade I listed houses
Timber framed buildings in England
Country houses in Lancashire
Buildings and structures in the Borough of Chorley